Iyassu Bekele  (born 17 May 1992) is an Ethiopian footballer. He currently plays for FC Kaliakra Kavarna of the Bulgarian North-East V AFG.

Career
Bekele started his career in the United States with Arlington Travel Soccer Club and played later for D.C. United. He studied on the University of Missouri–Kansas City, during this time played 212 for Nashville Metros and the U-23 of FC Dallas. On 1 May 2015 signed for National Premier Soccer League club FC Wichita. After leaving Wichita, played until June 2016 for L.A. Stars, in the Ethiopian Sports Federation in North America. After a half year with Dedebit F.C., signed in March 2017 for Bulgarian lower league club FC Kaliakra Kavarna.

International 
Bekele is member of the Ethiopia national football team. He played his debut on 12 November 2011 for  Ethiopia in the FIFA World Cup qualification against the Somalia national football team.

References

Living people
Ethiopian footballers
Ethiopia international footballers
D.C. United players
FC Dallas players
FC Wichita players
National Premier Soccer League players
2013 Africa Cup of Nations players
1992 births
Association football midfielders
Sportspeople from Addis Ababa